You Will Remember is a 1941 British musical drama film directed by Jack Raymond and starring Robert Morley, Emlyn Williams and Dorothy Hyson. It portrays the life of the composer Leslie Stuart. Featured songs include, Tell Me Pretty Maiden, Sue, Florodora, Lily of Laguna, Soldiers of the King  and Dolly Daydream.

It was made at Isleworth Studios. The film's art direction was by James A. Carter.

The title stems from the master of ceremonies in the British music halls who would say "You will remember (this song)" when introducing old favourites.

Plot
The film is a biography of popular English composer Tom Barrett known by his stage name Leslie Stuart (Robert Morley), who rose to fame through performances of his songs by the tenor Ellaline Terriss (Dorothy Hyson).

The film is told in flashback with an elderly Barrett listening to a band playing his tunes played by a band on a pier. The women next to him confidently tells him that the composer is dead.

We then go to his childhood, Manchester in 1870, where his relatively poor parents buy him a piano. He proves to be a prodigy. His first break comes in a small hall/bar where the regular piano player falls ill and he is asked to play Stephen Foster tunes. In later life he earns money teaching piano but is not satisfied.

He goes to a concert by Signor Foli (actually an Irishman called Foley) and they become friends. Foley convinces him to start writing songs full time but under a new name.

Despite growing success he is not good with money. Others are also printing his work without permission. This is partly addressed by the Copyright Act but is not enough to save him from debtors prison.

Leaving prison a day late (so he can finish reading a book on Beethoven) he descends to obscurity with the arrival of the Jazz Age.

Through good times and bad his childhood friend Bob Slater stands by him, and encourages him back into society. He has a comeback in British music halls shortly before his death.

Cast

Critical reception
Allmovie wrote, "Jack Raymond's perfunctory direction does not alway do full justice to his subject"; while TV Guide noted, "production numbers featuring the singing of music-hall performer Finglass are well done, overcoming the weaknesses of the sentimental screenplay."

References

Bibliography
 Lamb, Andrew. Leslie Stuart: Composer of Florodora. Psychology Press, 2002.

External links

1941 films
British musical drama films
1940s musical drama films
1940s historical musical films
British historical musical films
1940s English-language films
Films directed by Jack Raymond
Films shot at Isleworth Studios
Films set in England
Films set in London
Films set in the 1900s
Films set in the 1920s
British black-and-white films
1941 drama films
Films scored by Percival Mackey
1940s British films
British Lion Films films